Malcolm Collins (born 1935) is an ex-amateur boxer from Cardiff, Wales, who competed in the lightweight division. Never turning professional he is notable for represented Wales in two Commonwealth Games winning silver in both the 1954 Games in Vancouver and the 1958 Games in Cardiff.

Boxing career
Collins was a Cardiff-born growing up in the inner-city district of Canton. At the age of 17, he was selected as the sole member of the Wales boxing team to compete in the 1954 British Empire and Commonwealth Games in Vancouver. Collins reached the final where he faced Leonard Leisching of South Africa, the then current Olympic lightweight bronze medalist. Collins lost the final to take the silver medal.

Four years later, and still an amateur Collins was selected for the 1954 British Empire and Commonwealth Games, held in his home country of Wales. Collins build up to the Games was dogged by problems. Before the Games Collins entered the British Amateur Boxing Association lightweight competition. In the semi-final Collins broke his left-hand, but still won the fight. He also took the final, one handed, to win the title, but in the lead up to the Empire Games Collins was left with his hand in plaster. A few weeks before the Games the plaster was removed and Collins was declared fit to lead the ten man Wales team. Not only was Collins chosen as the head of the boxing squad but was also given the honour of being the flag-bearer for the Wales team in the opening ceremony. In his first round Collins out-pointed New Zealand fighter Maurice Purton which led to a semi-final bout with South African Gert Coetzee, Collins again won on points. On the finals' day both Collins and Wales team-mate Howard Winstone had a chance to win a gold medal. Winstone's match was first and he succeeded in defeating Australian Olly Taylor. Collins was next and faced Taylor's brother Wally. Collins started slowly, and although a late flurry saw him floor Taylor in the last round the Australian had done enough and took the decision and the gold medal leaving Collins with a second Commonwealth silver.

Collins won the 1957 and 1958 Amateur Boxing Association British featherweight title, when boxing out of the Melingriffith ABC.

Despite calls to turn professional Collins quit boxing after the 1958 Commonwealth Games, working as a linotype operator for the South Wales Echo. Despite no longer fighting Collins retained a connection to his sport, and managed several Wales amateur teams at European championships and at the 2006 Commonwealth Games.

References

Bibliography

1935 births
Boxers at the 1954 British Empire and Commonwealth Games
Boxers at the 1958 British Empire and Commonwealth Games
Commonwealth Games silver medallists for Wales
Lightweight boxers
Living people
Boxers from Cardiff
Welsh male boxers
Commonwealth Games medallists in boxing
Medallists at the 1954 British Empire and Commonwealth Games
Medallists at the 1958 British Empire and Commonwealth Games